The 26th Congress of the Communist Party of the Soviet Union (26th Congress of the CPSU) is a 342.57 carat fancy lemon yellow raw diamond, the largest gem diamond ever found in Russia or the territory of the former Soviet Union, and one of the largest in the world as of 2016.

It was mined at the Mir kimberlitic pipe (Yakutia, Far Eastern Federal District) on December 23, 1980, and named after the 26th Congress of the Communist Party of the Soviet Union, opening February 23, 1981. 

It is kept in the Russian Diamond Fund (Moscow Kremlin).

See also 
List of diamonds
List of largest rough diamonds

References 

Diamonds originating in Russia
Diamonds originating in the Soviet Union
Individual diamonds
Yellow diamonds
Diamond Fund